The Akaflieg München Mü31 is a high-performance single-seat glider aircraft that is under design in Germany as of 2010.

Development
After completion of the Akaflieg München Mü30 Schlacro, students turned to the design of a new 15m-FAI racing class glider, with a maximum span of 15m (49 ft 3in), a maximum of 150 liters (40 US gallons) of water ballast and full-span flaps. Designated Akaflieg München Mü31, this glider is being designed to minimize interference drag between fuselage and wing root, with several variations being studied to select the ideal configuration:
planar wing in midwing configuration (conventional).
high-mounted wing with a swept wing root/fuselage transition.
high-mounted wing with turbulent flow at the joint between wing and fuselage.

These concepts were wind-tunnel-tested in 2006. The third configuration was deemed to be best. The resulting fuselage wing joint is similar to a pylon with the wing suspended by the leading edge, leaving uninterrupted flow at the trailing edge. This layout has the advantages of:
continuous upper wing surface
only two intersections between fuselage and wing as opposed to four in a more conventional mounting
turbulence created by the wing/fuselage joint does not disturb flow over the rear of the fuselage pod and boom
approximately elliptical lift distribution can be attained, reducing induced drag significantly.

To keep construction costs low, the Mü31 will be built using components from the Schleicher ASW 27, such as the forward fuselage, rear fuselage and tail and outer wings.

Specifications and projected performance (Mü31)

References

External links

Mü31 progress report

2010s German sailplanes
Mu31
Aircraft first flown in 2017
High-wing aircraft
T-tail aircraft